Nordpfälzer Land is a Verbandsgemeinde ("collective municipality") in the Donnersbergkreis, Rhineland-Palatinate, Germany. The seat of the Verbandsgemeinde is in Rockenhausen. It was formed on 1 January 2020 by the merger of the former Verbandsgemeinden Rockenhausen and Alsenz-Obermoschel.

The Verbandsgemeinde Nordpfälzer Land consists of the following Ortsgemeinden ("local municipalities"):

 Alsenz
 Bayerfeld-Steckweiler
 Bisterschied
 Dielkirchen
 Dörrmoschel
 Finkenbach-Gersweiler
 Gaugrehweiler
 Gehrweiler
 Gerbach
 Gundersweiler
 Imsweiler
 Kalkofen
 Katzenbach
 Mannweiler-Cölln
 Münsterappel
 Niederhausen an der Appel
 Niedermoschel
 Oberhausen an der Appel
 Obermoschel2
 Oberndorf
 Ransweiler
 Rathskirchen
 Reichsthal
 Rockenhausen1, 2
 Ruppertsecken
 Sankt Alban
 Schiersfeld
 Schönborn
 Seelen
 Sitters
 Stahlberg
 Teschenmoschel
 Unkenbach
 Waldgrehweiler
 Winterborn
 Würzweiler

External links
Official website

Verbandsgemeinde in Rhineland-Palatinate